The 1925 Southern Branch Grizzlies football team was an American football team that represented the Southern Branch of the University of California (later known as UCLA) as a member of the Southern California Intercollegiate Athletic Conference (SCIAC) during the 1925 college football season.  The program, which was later known as the Bruins, was in its first year under head coach William H. Spaulding. The team compiled a 5–3–1 record but were outscored by a total of 130 to 91. The team played its home games at Moore Field.

Schedule

References

Southern Branch
UCLA Bruins football seasons
Southern Branch Grizzlies football